Jekyll & Hyde is the twentieth studio album released by Christian rock band Petra. It was released in 2003 by Inpop Records. It is the most recent studio album released by Petra to date (excluding the Spanish version, released the following year). The music features a progressive metal sound that drew comparison to Dio and Queensrÿche.

The title of the album is based on Robert Louis Stevenson's 1886 novella The Strange Case of Dr. Jekyll and Mr. Hyde due to the similar issues of sin and temptation it deals with.

Album background

Concept and songwriting
After the release of Revival, Petra's third praise album and their first album with Inpop Records, John Schlitt says fans started sending e-mails to the record company asking them for a more straightforward rock album. Inpop agreed to the idea and they started working on a second album together.

Schlitt has said that the record company encouraged Petra founder, guitarist and main songwriter Bob Hartman to "write those songs that you're used to writing. Don't try to write like this or try to be like that. Just be you" which motivated Hartman. New bassist Greg Bailey also collaborated in the writing of the song "Would'a, Could'a, Should'a", along with Hartman.

The concept of the album, and its title track, is a reference to Robert Louis Stevenson novella The Strange Case of Dr. Jekyll and Mr. Hyde. According to Hartman, it "is an intriguing look at the internal battle between right and wrong. It's about the fighting that goes on inside of us. It's like when Paul said, 'The things I want to do are the things I don't do, and the things I don't want to do are the things that I do.'"

According to Brent Handy, an industry insider that worked with singer John Schlitt on Project Damage Control, "the band thought that Jekyll & Hyde was a make-or-break album".

Recording

With Schlitt and Hartman as the only remaining members, Greg Bailey was hired as bassist. Bailey collaborated in the songwriting of one song and recorded background vocals. However, producer Peter Furler, one of Inpop's founders, decided to use session musicians Wade Jaynes and Phil Joel to play bass.

The album also features Furler on drums replacing long-time member Louie Weaver for the recording. However, temporary drummer Justin Johnson is partially featured on the album booklet. He would tour with the band until permanent drummer Paul Simmons was hired.

Track listing
All songs written by Bob Hartman, except where noted.
 "Jekyll & Hyde" – 3:04
 "All About Who You Know" – 2:35
 "Stand" – 3:19
 "Would'a, Should'a, Could'a" (words & music by Hartman and Greg Bailey) – 2:58
 "Perfect World" – 3:13
 "Test of Time" – 3:00
 "I Will Seek You" – 2:34
 "Life As We Know It" – 3:27
 "Till Everything I Do" – 3:03
 "Sacred Trust" – 3:52

Awards
 Nominated for Grammy Award for Best Rock Gospel Album in 2003.

Personnel 
Petra
 John Schlitt – lead vocals
 Bob Hartman – guitars
 Greg Bailey – backing vocals

Guest musicians
 Jeff Frankenstein – programming 
 Wade Jaynes – bass
 Phil Joel – bass guitar, backing vocals
 Peter Furler – drums, backing vocals,
 Jamie Rowe – backing vocals

Production
 Peter Furler – producer
 Dan Rudin – engineer at Bridge St. Studios
 Bob Hartman – additional engineer at House of Bob Studios
 Tony Palacios – mixing at The Sound Kitchen, Franklin, Tennessee
 Kevin Pickle – mix assistant
 Richard Dodd – mastering at Vital Recordings, Nashville, Tennessee
 Clark Hook – cover art and design
 Jennie Rollings – cover art and design
 Allen Clark – photography

References 

2003 albums
Petra (band) albums
Inpop Records albums
Works based on Strange Case of Dr Jekyll and Mr Hyde